Jelena Ana Milcetic a.k.a. Helen Merrill is a 2000 studio album by Helen Merrill. The album is a tribute to Merrill's Croatian heritage.

Reception

The Allmusic review by Alex Henderson awarded the album four and a half stars and said it was a "Helen Merrill has never been afraid to take chances, but the veteran jazz singer is especially ambitious on Jelena Ana Milcetic, an autobiographical (or at least semi-autobiographical) work that draws on jazz, pop, and folk as well as traditional Croatian music...But as unpredictable and eclectic as this album is, the CD never sounds confused or aimless...everything fits together perfectly. Jelena Ana Milcetic is among Merrill's most impressive accomplishments".

Track listing
 "Kirje" - 3:15
 "Imagining Krk" - 2:15
 "Long, Long Ago" (Thomas Haynes Bayly) - 4:35
 "My Father" - 7:18
 "La Paloma" (Sebastián Iradier) - 5:57
 "Tanac" (Traditional) - 1:41
 "Wayfarin' Stranger" (Traditional) - 4:26
 "I'll Take You Home Again, Kathleen" (Thomas P. Westendorf) - 5:30
 "Lost in the Stars" (Kurt Weill, Maxwell Anderson) - 5:19
 "Sometimes I Feel Like a Motherless Child" (Traditional) - 5:36
 "Among My Souvenirs" (Edgar Leslie, Lawrence Wright) - 3:47
 "Nobody Knows" (Alan Bergman, Marilyn Bergman, Michel Legrand) - 2:33
 "Ti si rajski cvijet (You Are a Flower from Paradise)" - 1:01

Personnel
Helen Merrill - vocals
Dominic Cortese - accordion
Gil Goldstein - accordion, arranger, piano
Torrie Zito - arranger, conductor, Fender Rhodes
Jesse Levy - cello
Frank Zuback - conductor
George Mraz - double bass
Jeff Mironov - guitar
Gloria Agostini - harp
Dennis Anderson - English horn, oboe
Steve Kroon - percussion
Roland Hanna - piano
Steve Lacy - soprano saxophone

References

Verve Records albums
Helen Merrill albums
2000 albums
Albums arranged by Torrie Zito
Croatian-language albums